Sickte is a Samtgemeinde ("collective municipality") in the district of Wolfenbüttel, in Lower Saxony, Germany. Its seat is in the village Sickte.

The Samtgemeinde Sickte consists of the following municipalities:
 Dettum 
 Erkerode 
 Evessen 
 Sickte
 Veltheim

Wolfenbüttel (district)
Samtgemeinden in Lower Saxony